Ekram Ali (born 1 July 1950) is an Indian Bengali poet and critic.

Life
Ali was born in Teghoria (Dist. Birbhum, West Bengal) of a Bengali Muslim parentage. Before he came to Kolkata and took up journalism in a Bengali daily newspaper- Aajkaal, Ekram was brought up in Birbhum.

Poetry

Atijeebito [অতিজীবিত] (1983).
Ghanakrishna Aalo [ঘনকৃষ্ণ আলো] (1988) and (sristi edition:2000) .
Aandhar Taranga [আঁধারতরঙ্গ] (1991).
Baanraajpur [বাণরাজপুর] (2000) .
Ekram Alir Kobita [একরাম আলির কবিতা] (2001).
Ekram Alir Shreshtha Kobita [একরাম আলির শ্রেষ্ঠ কবিতা] (2008) .
Pralaykatha [প্রলয়কথা] (2009).
Andhar poridhi [আঁধার পরিধি] (2013).
Bautir kobita [বাউটির কবিতা] (2014).
Kobita sangraha [কবিতা সংগ্রহ] (2017) .
bipanna Granthipunja [বিপন্ন গ্রন্থিপুঞ্জ] (2017).
Pora Matir Ghori [পোড়া মাটির ঘড়ি] (2020).

Memoir
Dhulopaye [ধুলোপায়ে] (2015, 2019) 
Harrison Road [হ্যারিসন রোড] (2020)

Novel
Digonter Ektu Age [দিগন্তের একটু আগে] (2015)

Essays
Musalman Bangalir Lokachar [মুসলমান বাঙালির লোকাচার] (2006).
Apollor paakhi [অ্যাপোলোর পাখি] (2008) .
Bedonatur Alokrekha [বেদনাতুর আলোকরেখা] (2020) .

Biography
Atish Dipankar [অতীশ দীপংকর] (1997)

Awards
 Birendra Puraskar for 'Ghanakrishna Alo' in 1990.
 Paschim Banga Bangla Academy Award for 'Dulopaye' in 2016.

References

External links 
 Muse India - Ekram Ali's Profile
 samowiki - Ekram Ali
 poemhunter.com poems
 poemhunter.com bio
 Voices from Bengal Modern Bengali Poetry in English Translation 2nd Revised Edition | Manabendra Bandyopadhyay, Sukanta Chaudhuri, Swapan Majumdar. page-119

Bengali male poets
20th-century Bengali poets
Bengali poets
20th-century Bengalis
21st-century Bengalis
Indian male poets
20th-century Indian poets
21st-century Indian poets
Living people
1950 births
Bengali Muslims
People from Birbhum district
Poets from West Bengal
20th-century Indian writers
20th-century Indian male writers
21st-century Indian writers
21st-century Indian male writers
Writers from West Bengal
Indian essayists
Indian male essayists
20th-century Indian essayists
21st-century Indian essayists
Indian memoirists
Indian biographers
Indian novelists
21st-century Indian novelists
Indian literary critics